Bavanaka Parameswar Sandeep (born 25 April 1992) is an Indian first-class cricketer who plays for Hyderabad. He was the leading run-scorer for Hyderabad in the 2017–18 Ranji Trophy, with 400 runs in four matches.

In July 2018, he was named in the squad for India Red for the 2018–19 Duleep Trophy. In November 2018, he scored his 3,000th run in first-class cricket, batting for Hyderabad against Kerala in the 2018–19 Ranji Trophy.

References

External links
 

1992 births
Living people
Indian cricketers
Hyderabad cricketers
India Red cricketers
Cricketers from Hyderabad, India